Gilmore Township is the name of some places in the U.S. state of Michigan:

 Gilmore Township, Benzie County, Michigan
 Gilmore Township, Isabella County, Michigan

Michigan township disambiguation pages